The Social and Political Education League was a nineteenth century English educational organisation. It was founded as the in 1877 by Henry Solly and in 1879 John Robert Seeley had become president. In 1881 it was renamed the Social and Political Education League.

References

1877 establishments in England